Bourgneuf-en-Retz is a former commune in the Loire-Atlantique department in western France. On 1 January 2016, it was merged into the new commune of Villeneuve-en-Retz.

Climate 
Climate Les Moutiers en Retz

Population

Transport
Gare de Bourgneuf-en-Retz is served by train services between Pornic and Nantes.

See also
Communes of the Loire-Atlantique department
The works of Jean Fréour Sculptor of René-Guy Cadou memorial with bust of the poet.

References

External links

Official site

Former communes of Loire-Atlantique
Populated places disestablished in 2016